The Opel Flextreme is a diesel plug-in hybrid concept small family hatchback created by Opel in 2008. The Opel Flextreme shares the same GM E-Flex platform as the Chevrolet Volt (front engine, four door).

Overview

It is based on the same GM E-Flex series hybrid platform used in the Chevrolet Volt, but using a diesel rather than gasoline engine. It can travel  on its lithium-ion battery before a small diesel engine starts charging the battery. 

The Opel Flextreme is a small family car with a 5-door hatchback body styling with 5 seats.

In January 2008, a rebadged version of the concept was introduced at the North American International Auto Show as the Saturn Flextreme. 
The Opel Flextreme is expected to emit 40 grams of CO2 per km or less (according to European test procedure ECE R101 for range extender vehicles).

References

External links
 GM press release
BBC NEWS   Business | Car firms eye emissions at show
Frankfurt Preview: Opel Flextreme revealed! - Autoblog
Opel Flextreme at the IAA 2007
Saturn Flextreme

Flextreme
Compact cars
Hatchbacks
Plug-in hybrid vehicles
Electric concept cars